Luis Brignoni Alvarez (born 9 November 1953) is a Puerto Rican former basketball player who competed in the 1976 Summer Olympics.

On Puerto Rico's professional basketball league, the BSN, he played with the Vaqueros de Bayamon and Criollos de Caguas among others.

References

1953 births
Living people
Puerto Rican men's basketball players
1974 FIBA World Championship players
Olympic basketball players of Puerto Rico
Basketball players at the 1976 Summer Olympics
Basketball players at the 1975 Pan American Games
Pan American Games silver medalists for Puerto Rico
Pan American Games medalists in basketball
Medalists at the 1975 Pan American Games
Criollos de Caguas basketball players